Hans Frischknecht (31 December 1922 – 9 August 2003) was a Swiss long-distance runner. He competed in the marathon at the 1948 Summer Olympics.

References

External links
 

1922 births
2003 deaths
Athletes (track and field) at the 1948 Summer Olympics
Swiss male long-distance runners
Swiss male marathon runners
Olympic athletes of Switzerland
Place of birth missing